Anorena is a genus of moths of the family Noctuidae.

Species
Anorena hyrtacides Schaus, 1914
Anorena melie (Schaus, 1912)

References
Natural History Museum Lepidoptera genus database

Catocalinae
Noctuoidea genera